The knockout stage of 1978 FIFA World Cup was a single-elimination tournament involving the four teams that qualified from the second group stage of the tournament. There were two matches: a third place play-off contested by the group runners-up, and the final to decide the champions, contested by the group winners. The knockout stage began with the third place play-off on 24 June and ended with the final on 25 June 1978, both at the Estadio Monumental in Buenos Aires. Argentina won the tournament with a 3–1 victory over the Netherlands.

All times ART

Qualified teams
The top two placed teams from each of the two groups of the second round qualified for the knockout stage.

Third place play-off
This, as of the 2022 FIFA World Cup, was the most recent time when the third place match was won by a non-European team.

Final

References

External links
 1978 FIFA World Cup archive

1978 FIFA World Cup
1978
Netherlands at the 1978 FIFA World Cup
Argentina at the 1978 FIFA World Cup
Brazil at the 1978 FIFA World Cup
Italy at the 1978 FIFA World Cup